Violante may refer to:

Given name
Duchess Violante Beatrice of Bavaria (1673–1731), Grand Princess of Tuscany
Violante Beatrice Siries (1709–1783), Italian painter
Violante do Ceo (1601–1693), Portuguese writer and nun
Violante Placido (born 1976), Italian actress and singer
Violante of Vilaragut, Majorcan noble
Violante Visconti (1354–1386), Italian noble

Other
Luciano Violante (born 1941), Italian judge and politician
Signora Violante, 18th century dancer and theatre company manager.
Violante (Titian), oil painting
Violante Inlet, inlet in Antarctica